Karam is a harvest festival celebrated in Indian states of Jharkhand, West Bengal, Bihar, Madhya Pradesh, Chhattisgarh, Assam, Odisha and Bangladesh. It is dedicated to the worship of Karam-Devta (Karam-Lord/God), the god of power, youth and youthfulness. It celebrated for good harvest and health. 

The festival is held on the 11th day of a full moon (Purnima) of the Hindu month of Bhado, which falls between August and September. Unmarried girls fast and grow seedlings for 7-9 days. Then next day, groups of young villagers go to the jungle and collect wood, fruits, and flowers. These are required during the puja (worship) of the Karam God. During this period, people sing and dance together in groups. The entire valley dances to the drumbeat "day of the phases". The Karam festival celebrated by diverse groups of people, including: Korwa, Sadan, Bagal, Baiga, Binjhwari, Bhumij, Oraon, Kharia, Munda, Kudmi, Karmali, Lohra and many more.

Summary of the ritual
This festival celebrated for good harvest. Nine type of seeds planted in basket such as rice, wheat, corn etc which is called Jawa. Girl take care of these seeds for 7–9 days. In festival girls fast throughout day.
In the ritual, people go to the jungle accompanied by groups of drummers and cut one or more branches of the Karam tree after worshiping it. The branches are usually carried by unmarried, young girls who sing in praise of the deity. Then the branches are brought to the village and planted in the center of the ground which is plastered with cow-dung and decorated with flowers. A village priest (Pahan or Dehuri according to region) offers germinated grains and liquor in propitiation to the deity who grants wealth and children. A fowl is also killed and the blood is offered to the branch. The village priest then recites a legend to the villagers about the efficacy of Karam puja. After puja, in the next morning the karam branch immersed in the river. 

The festival is observed in two ways. Firstly, it is commonly held by the villagers on the village street and the expenses on liquor etc. are commonly borne. Alternatively, it is celebrated by a man in his courtyard under his patronage to which he invites all. Even people who come uninvited listening to the sound of drums are also entertained with liquor.

Details
The Karam festival is celebrated usually on Bhado Ekadashi, on the eleventh day of the bright full moon (Purnima) of the month of Bhado (August–September). The Karam tree, scientifically named Nauclea Parvifolia is the center of the proceedings of the festival. The preparations for the Karam festival begin around ten or twelve days before the festival. Nine type of seeds planted in basket such as rice, wheat, corn etc which is called Jawa. Girl take care these seeds for 7–9 days.

The morning of the Karam festival begins with women pounding rice in the dheki, a wooden implement, to obtain rice flour. This rice flour is used to make a local delicacy which can be sweet as well as salty. This delicacy is cooked in the morning of the Karam festival for consumption, and shared throughout the neighborhood.

Then the people begin the ritual dance with a yellow bloom tucked behind their ear. A branch of the Karam tree is carried by the Karam dancers and passed among them while they are singing and dancing. This branch is washed with milk and rice beer (Tapan). Then, the branch is raised in the middle of the dancing arena. After reciting the legend - the story behind the worshiping of Karam (Nature/God/Goddess) - all the men and women drink liquor and spend the entire night singing and dancing; both are essential parts of the festival, Which is known as Karam Naach.

Women dance to the beat of drums and folk songs (siring). The Puja is followed by a community feast and the drinking of hariya. The next day, the Karam tree is sprinkled with curd of the seas and immersed in the river bed.

Philosophy
Karam is a harvest festival. The festival also has a close link to nature. People worship trees during this festival as they are a source of livelihood, and they pray to mother nature to keep their farmlands green and ensure a rich harvest. It is believed that the worship for good germination increases the fertility of grain crops. Karam Devta (the God of power, youth and youthfulness) is worshiped during the festival. The devotees keep a day-long fast and worship the branches of karam and sal. Girls celebrate the festival for welfare, friendship and sisterhood by exchanging a jawa flower.

Story behind the celebration
There are multiple versions of the story behind the origin of Karam Puja. Anthropologist Hari Mohan writes that after the rituals are over, the karam story is narrated to boys and girls. The story behind the festival, according to Mohan, is this:

Once upon a time there were seven brothers who labored hard at agriculture work. They had no time even for lunch; therefore, their wives carried their lunches to the field daily. Once it so happened that their wives did not bring the lunches for them. They were hungry. In the evening they returned home and found that their wives were dancing and singing near a branch of the karam tree in the court yard. This made them angry, and one of the brothers lost his temper. He snatched the karam branch and threw it into the river. The karam deity was insulted; as a result, the economic condition of their family continued to deteriorate and they were brought to the point of starvation. One day a Brahman (priest) came to them, and the seven brothers told him the whole story. The seven brothers then left the village in search of the Karam Rani. They kept on moving from place to place and, one day, they found the karam tree. Subsequently, they worshiped it and their economic condition began to improve.

Among the Bhumijs and the Oraons the legend is that there were seven brothers living together. The six oldest used to work in the field and the youngest stayed at home. He was indulging in dance and songs round a karam tree in the courtyard with his six sisters-in-law. One day, they were so engrossed in dance and song that the brothers' morning meal was not carried to the field by the wives. When the brothers arrived home, they became agitated and threw the karam tree into a river. The youngest brother left home in anger. Then evil days fell on the remaining brothers. Their house was damaged, the crops failed, and they virtually starved. While wandering, the youngest brother found the karam tree floating in the river. Then he propitiated the god, who restored everything. Thereafter he returned home and called his brothers and told them that because they insulted Karam Devta, they fell on evil days. Since then the Karam Devta has been worshipped.

Another legend prevalent among the Pauri Bhuiyans is that a merchant returned home after a very prosperous voyage. His vessel was loaded with precious metals and other valuables which he had brought from distant lands. He waited in the vessel to be ceremoniously received by his wife and relatives, as was the custom. As it was the day of the Karam festival, all the women were engrossed with dancing and the men with playing the drums, so no one came to receive him. The merchant became furious with them. He uprooted the karam tree and threw it away. Then the wrath of Karam Devta fell on him. His vessel immediately sank in the sea. The merchant consulted astrologers who told him to propitiate Karam Devta. He launched another vessel, set out in search of the deity, and found him floating in the sea. He propitiated him with great devotion and all his wealth was restored. From that day on, the annual festival of Karam Puja has been held. After spending the whole night with dance and songs, the people uproot the branches and carry them to nearby rivers or rivulets for immersion.

Further reading

References

External links

Harvest festivals
Hindu festivals
Religious festivals in India
Festivals in Jharkhand
Culture of Jharkhand
Nagpuri culture